The Chica and Heinz Schaller Foundation is a charitable foundation in Heidelberg, Germany. Established by the scientists Chica Schaller and Heinz Schaller (co-founder of Biogen), its main objective is to support young scientists within the Heidelberg Science Community

The Annual Chica and Heinz Schaller Research Award 
With its 100,000€↑ prize money this yearly award is one of the highest awards for junior scientists in Germany. If more than one awardee is selected, each laureate receives the full sum.

Chica and Heinz Schaller Research Groups 
Since 2012 the Foundation funds Schaller Junior Research groups at the University of Heidelberg and DKFZ. Initially five groups were funded for a period of five years with the possibility of a two year extension.
 Cellular Polarity and Viral Infection - Steeve Boulant
 Neuropeptides - Valery Grinevich
 Proteostasis in Neurodegenerative Disease - Dr. Thomas Jahn
 Norovirus Research - Grant Hansman
 Mechanisms of Tumor Cell invasion - Björn Thews
In Fall 2017 four new group leaders were selected by the interdisciplinary committee.

Chica and Heinz Schaller Endowed Chair 
Between 2002 and 2012 the Foundation Ralf Bartenschlager held the chair for Molecular Virology before being appointed full professor at the University of Heidelberg

References

External links
 http://www.cellnetworks.uni-hd.de/807253/Chica_and_Heinz_Schaller_Foundation

Educational foundations
Foundations based in Germany
Education in Heidelberg